Walter Kramer may refer to:

 Walter R. Kramer (1914–1995), American badminton player
 A. Walter Kramer, American music critic, music publisher, and composer
 Walter Krämer (born 1948), German economist and statistician
 Walter Kraemer (1892–1941), German communist politician and resistance member

 Walter Kramer (field hockey), played Field hockey at the 1999 Pan American Games
 Wally Kramer, in 1986 Australian Touring Car Championship